Chhijmuni (Aymara chhijmu edible part of the clover plant, -ni a suffix to indicate ownership, "the one with the chhijmu", Hispanicized spelling Chicmune) is a  mountain in the Wansu mountain range in the Andes of Peru. It is located in the Arequipa Region, La Unión Province,  Puyca District. Chhijmuni lies south of Wayta Urqu.

References 

Mountains of Arequipa Region